Ranvir Singh (born 11 August 1977) is a British journalist and television presenter. She is the political editor and newsreader/deputy presenter for Good Morning Britain.

Early life
Singh was born in 1977 in Preston, Lancashire, into a Sikh family. Educated at Kirkham Grammar School, an independent school in Kirkham, Lancashire, she graduated from the University of Lancaster with a degree in English and Philosophy. She then gained a postgraduate qualification in journalism at the School of Journalism, Media and Communication, University of Central Lancashire in Preston.

Career
Singh joined BBC Radio Lancashire in 2002, initially on work experience before being given a six-month contract. She then moved to BBC GMR, covering the 2002 Commonwealth Games in Manchester. Singh joined the BBC North West regional news programme North West Tonight in 2005 as a journalist and bulletin presenter. Her first national presenting role came on Good Friday, 2006 when she co-presented Manchester Passion, a live BBC Three play that retold the last hours of Jesus Christ.

On 10 September 2007, Singh joined long-serving presenter Gordon Burns as the main co-presenter on BBC North West Tonight. Former BBC South Today sports editor Roger Johnson became Singh's co-presenter in October 2011 following Burns' departure. While working on North West Tonight, Singh was also a regular presenter for late night and weekend breakfast shows on BBC Radio 5 Live. Singh went on maternity leave from North West Tonight on 18 May 2012. It was later announced that she would not be returning to the BBC but would be joining the ITV Breakfast programme Daybreak. She made her first appearance on Daybreak on 3 September 2012.

In 2012, Singh occasionally reviewed the newspapers on This Morning. In May 2014, Singh joined Good Morning Britain as a features correspondent and news presenter with Susanna Reid, Sean Fletcher, Ben Shephard and Charlotte Hawkins. Since May 2014, Singh has been a relief newscaster on various ITV News bulletins. On 25 September 2014, Singh joined the factual ITV programme Tonight as a reporter. Since March 2015, she has guest presented numerous Exposure specials. From 2015 until 2016, Ranvir presented two primetime series for ITV called Real Stories with Ranvir Singh.

In 2016 and 2017, Singh co-presented The Martin Lewis Money Show alongside Martin Lewis, but was later replaced by Angellica Bell.  In January 2017, it was announced that Ranvir had been promoted to Good Morning Britains Political Editor. Since the summer of 2017, Singh presented Eat, Shop, Save for ITV. In 2017, Singh was presenting Good Morning Britain the day of the 2017 Westminster attack and garnered much praise for her ability to respond and react quickly to the developing story.  The Good Morning Britain Team then went on to win a prestigious Golden Nymph Award in the ‘Live Breaking News’ category at the 59th Monte-Carlo Television Festival in 2019, beating CNN and Al Jazeera.

Singh's highlights at Good Morning Britain also include travelling around the world on board the RAF Voyager with the Prime Minister, with visits including China, Canada and inside the White House with President Trump, and live reporting from the ground as the Grenfell Tower fire unfolded. Since 2020, Singh has been a guest presenter on Loose Women. On 2 September 2020, it was announced that Singh would be taking part in the eighteenth series of Strictly Come Dancing. She was partnered with Giovanni Pernice. They reached the Semi-Final so were fifth place overall behind the four finalists Jamie Laing, HRVY, Maisie Smith and champion Bill Bailey.

From 6 September 2020, Singh co-presented ten episodes of ITV’s All Around Britain, a new weekly topical magazine series, with fellow Good Morning Britain presenter Alex Beresford. She was replaced with Lorraine entertainment presenter, Ria Hebden, while participating in the 18th series of Strictly Come Dancing. On 16 December 2020, it was announced that Singh would be presenting Lorraine on the 21st, 22nd, and 23 December while main presenter, Lorraine Kelly, takes a Christmas Break. In 2021, Singh continued to guest present on Lorraine.

Awards and honours
 In November 2010, Singh was awarded “Best On Screen Talent” at the  Royal Television Society's North West Awards.
 On 13 August 2014, she received the Alumni Award from Lancaster University.
 In October 2015, she won Media Personality of the Year at the Asian Media Awards.

Scholastic

 Chancellor, visitor, governor, rector and fellowships

Honorary degrees

Personal life
Singh lives in the Chilterns with her son Tushaan.

Filmography
Television

References

Living people
Mass media people from Preston, Lancashire
English people of Indian descent
English Sikhs
People educated at Kirkham Grammar School
Alumni of Lancaster University
Alumni of Pendle College, Lancaster
Alumni of the University of Central Lancashire
British women television journalists
English television journalists
BBC newsreaders and journalists
BBC North West newsreaders and journalists
ITV Breakfast presenters and reporters
British women radio presenters
1977 births